Conrad Winchester Hall (born November 13, 1958, in Los Angeles) is an American cinematographer.  He is the son of the Oscar-winning cinematographer Conrad L. Hall.

Conrad Wynn Hall's cinematography work began in the 2000s with Panic Room (2002) and has continued since, doing The Punisher (2004) and Olympus Has Fallen (2013). Before becoming cinematographer, he worked with his father on several productions including A Civil Action (1998) and American Beauty (1999) as camera operator and director of photography (second unit).

Filmography

Feature films

Television

Other credits
First assistant camera
 Movers & Shakers (1985)
 Creator (1985)
 Sweet Dreams (1985)
 Pretty in Pink (1986)
 Ferris Bueller's Day Off (1986)
 Black Widow (1987)
 The Milagro Beanfield War (1988)
 Tequila Sunrise (1988)
 Class Action (1991)
 V.I. Warshawski (1991)
 All I Want for Christmas (1991)
 Jack the Bear (1993)

Camera operator
 Jennifer 8 (1992) 
 What's Love Got to Do with It (1993)
 Free Willy (1993)
 Love Affair (1994)
 Under Siege 2: Dark Territory (1995)
 Se7en (1995)
 The Phantom (1996) 
 Larger than Life (1996) 
 Grosse Pointe Blank (1997)
 Alien Resurrection (1997) 
 Without Limits (1998)
 A Civil Action (1998)
 Fight Club (1999)

Second unit
 The Phantom (1996)
 Without Limits (1998)
 American Beauty (1999)
 Sleepy Hollow (1999)
 Case 39 (2009) (uncredited)
 Air Strike (2018)

Other roles
Up the Creek (1984) (second assistant camera)
Cloak & Dagger (1984) (assistant camera)

External links

References 

1958 births
Living people
American cinematographers
People from Los Angeles